Margaret Ruth Bhatty (5 October 1930 – 20 July 2012) was an Indian schoolteacher, freelance journalist and writer of children's books and short stories for adults.

Biography

Early life 
Margaret Ruth Bhatty was born on 5 October 1930 to Mark Vernon Grundy and Pansy Gunasekra in Berinag, which is currently part of the Indian state of Uttarakhand.  She spent her childhood in Berinag, fishing, hunting and trekking in the Kumaon region. A deep love for nature was instilled in her during her growing years in Berinag. She attended Wellesley Girls School, Nainital. She later went on to pursue a Bachelor of Arts degree from Isabella Thoburn College, Lucknow and then a postgraduate degree in Journalism from Nagpur.

Family and marriage 
On 17 December 1954, she wed Feroze Bhatty. They have two children together: a son, Arvind (born 25 December 1955) and a daughter Pritam (born 13 September 1960).

Bhatty died on 20 July 2012 in Jehangir Hospital, Pune.

Career 
Margaret Bhatty worked as a teacher in Isabella Thoburn College, Lucknow after she completed her college education. She also worked as a journalist in Nagpur, contributing articles to The Hitavada newspaper. Bhatty worked as a school teacher at Kimmins High School, Panchgani in 1963 and at All Saints Girls School, Nainital.

She was a regular contributor to the popular children's magazine Target and English-language newspapers in India, and was also published in magazines of humanist and secular organizations in India, Australia, New Zealand, the USA and on the internet.

Awards 
Margaret Bhatty won the first prize in the 1982  BBC World Service International Story Contest among 800 entries worldwide for her story, "All is Maya, All is Illusion". This story was published in the BBC's collection of stories, Short Stories from Around the World.

In 1995, she won the BBC World Service International Drama Contest for her radio play on communal violence, My Enemy, My Friend.

List of works

Plays 
 My Enemy, My Friend

Children's books 
 The Adventures of Bhim the Bold (1976)
 The Never-Never Bird (1979)
 The Secret of Sickle Moon Mountain (1981)
 Travelling Companions (1982)
 The Red and Gold Shoe (1984)
 Little Old Woman (picture book) (1990)
 The Evil Empire (1992)
 Kingdom of No Return (1993)
 The Circus Boy
 The Family at Paangar Pani (1995)
 The Mystery of the Zamorin's Treasure (1995)
 Himalayan Holiday
 Kidnapping at Birpur
 Chicken Mama (2007)

Novels 
 The Arsonist (2011)

Short stories for adults 
 "Miss Das and the Population Explosion" (1960)
 "The Murderer in the Cow-shed", published in Winter Tales 17 (1971)
 "The Resin Man", published in Winter Tales 22 (1976)
 "Reprieve" (1977)
 "Bella's World" (excerpt from the novel The Return of the Sorceress) (1998)
 "The Birdman" (2001)

Narrative nonfiction 
 Astrology: Science or Ego-Trip by B. Premanand & Margaret Bhatty (2002)
 Fraud, Fakery and Flim-Flam (2008)
Freedom

References 
Bhatty, Margaret R. Travelling Companions. New Delhi: Thomson, 1982. Print.	
Bhatty, Margaret. Puffin's Treasury of Modern Indian Stories. 1st ed. Puffin, 2002. Print.	
Bhatty, Margaret. "Fraud, Fakery and Flim-flam." WorldCat.org. Web. 20 Nov. 2015.
Bhatty, Margaret. "Margaret Bhatty." Pitara Kids Network. Web. 20 Nov. 2015.	
Bhatty, Margaret R. Travelling Companions. New Delhi: Thomson, 1982. Print.	
Bhatty, Margaret R., and Priyankar Gupta. Chicken Mama and Other Stories. New Delhi: Puffin, 2007. Print.

External links
Margaret Bhatty at Penguin India

1930 births
2012 deaths
Indian women short story writers
Indian women novelists
Indian women children's writers
Indian children's writers
20th-century Indian short story writers
20th-century Indian women writers
Journalists from Uttarakhand
20th-century Indian novelists
20th-century Indian dramatists and playwrights
Indian women dramatists and playwrights
Women writers from Uttarakhand
Indian women journalists
20th-century Indian journalists
21st-century Indian novelists
21st-century Indian women writers
21st-century Indian writers
21st-century Indian journalists
21st-century Indian short story writers
Novelists from Uttarakhand